Shanti Lal Jain is an Indian businessman. He is the Managing Director and Chief Executive Officer of Indian Bank. He was the former Executive  Director of Bank of Baroda.

Early life and education
Jain is a Post Graduate in Commerce.

Career
Jain started his career in
in 1993 by joining Allahabad Bank and became the General Manager of the Bank.As the General Manager, he served as Chief Financial Officer, Chief Risk Officer and lead the IT department of the Bank. In September 2018, he joined as the Executive Director in Bank of Baroda. In 1 September 2021, he became the Managing Director and Chief Executive Officer of Indian Bank. He is also a member on the Managing Committee of Indian Banks Association and the Insurance Advisory Committee of IRDAI.

References

Living people
Indian bankers
Indian chief executives
Indian businesspeople
Year of birth missing (living people)